Helen "Ma" Armstrong (née Jury; 1875–1947) was a Canadian human rights and labour activist, who took part in the 1919 Winnipeg general strike.

Advocacy 

Armstrong developed a reputation for herself as a radical activist even before the General Strike in 1919. In 1917, she aided the Women’s Labour League, which helped in "union organization, political advocacy, the education of women workers on…their own rights." She had a strong belief in the equality of men and women and was adamant about empowering women to fight for themselves. She stated in a letter to the editor of The Telegram in 1917: "Girls have got to learn to fight as men have had to do for the right to live, and we women of the Labor League are spending all our spare time in trying to get girls to organize as the master class have done to protect their own interests." In 1918, she was a leader in the "campaign for minimum-wage legislation for women in Manitoba."

During the First World War, she advocated on behalf of the ‘aliens’, or those deemed to be interned enemies for opposing the conscription, as well as lobbying the government for increased pensions for soldiers' wives and children. She was imprisoned many times for her activism, along with her husband, but still continued to be an outspoken advocate for the oppressed populations of Canada throughout her time.

Throughout the Winnipeg General Strike in 1919, many were fighting to obtain a set minimum wage, an eight-hour work day, as well as the right to organize a union. This strike is considered to be the most crucial in regards to Canadian history. During the General Strike, she campaigned against the wage inequality between men and women, and for changes in the unhealthy conditions many women faced while working. She advocated on behalf of all women, regardless of their class or occupation. She did so in terms of "walking the picket line, making her case in the provincial legislature, or facing the police court magistrate […] in a letter to the deputy minister of labour she wrote "the lives of many of our working girls... so unbearable that in the end the street claims them as easy prey." During the strike, she was able to help many women who had left work in order to aid in the movement, by having places where they could go and receive food and when possible, help with money to pay rent.

Personal life and death
Helen Jury was born in 1875 in Toronto, Ontario. She was the eldest daughter of a family with ten children.
While living in Toronto she worked as a tailor in her father’s tailoring shop. Her father, Alfred Jury, was a member of the Knights of Labor which was a "working class organization that campaigned for the nine-hour day…" Helen met George Armstrong in Toronto, whom she later married. Together, they moved to the United States, and moved to Winnipeg in 1905. Helen had four children, but also worked outside the home.

Helen Armstrong died April 18, 1947 in Los Angeles, California, where she was also buried. In 2001, director Paula Kelly made a documentary on Helen’s life titled The Notorious Mrs. Armstrong.

References

External links
Helen Armstrong fonds at Archives of Manitoba

1875 births
1947 deaths
Canadian activists
Activists from Toronto
Canadian women's rights activists
Canadian human rights activists
Women human rights activists
Trade unionists from Ontario
Canadian women activists
Trade unionists from Manitoba
Canadian women trade unionists
People of the Winnipeg general strike
Canadian expatriates in the United States